Nuniaat Qaqqarsua is a mountain of Greenland. It is located in the Upernavik Archipelago.

Mountains of the Upernavik Archipelago